Jirka Arndt is a German Olympic long-distance runner. He represented his country in the men's 5000 meters at the 2000 Summer Olympics. His time was a 13:26.18 in the qualifiers, and a 13:38.57 in the final.

References

External links
 

1973 births
Living people
German male long-distance runners
Olympic athletes of Germany
Athletes (track and field) at the 2000 Summer Olympics
People from Wolgast
Sportspeople from Mecklenburg-Western Pomerania